The Monument to Eloy Gonzalo is an instance of public art in Madrid, Spain.

History and description 
It is a monument dedicated to  a Spanish soldier in the Cuban War independence who, in September 1896—during a siege by a party of about 2,500 Cuban mambises equipped with 70 mm battalion guns on a small regiment of Spanish soldiers garrisoned in the small village of — reportedly volunteered to his superiors in a nearly suicidal mission to infiltrate the enemy lines and fire the hut used as a warehouse for the weaponry of the enemy. Reportedly equipped with a 10-liter gasoline can, a Mauser rifle, a torch and a rope (to tie himself allowing for the retrieval of his corpse in case he fell in action, as he was certain of) he succeeded against all odds, helping to demoralize the enemy until the lift of the siege by General Adolfo Jiménez Castellanos, only to die of dysentery in Matanzas in June 1897.

The bronze statue designed by Aniceto Marinas (cast in Barcelona at Masriera y Campins' foundry) represents a 2.30 metre full-body Eloy Gonzalo wearing the rayadillo uniform characteristic of the Spanish soldiers during the conflict, strapped at chest height by a rope, wielding a flaming torch with his right hand while he holds the oil can with his left arm, also carrying a rifle and a machete. The plinth, made of marble and white stone, was designed by José López Sallaberry.

It was unveiled at its original location at the Plaza de Cascorro—mentioned at the time as Plaza del Rastro—on 5 June 1902, matching it with the inauguration of a number of outdoor sculptures in Madrid on the occasion of the celebrations for the coming of age of King Alfonso XIII (delayed several times by bad weather), featuring notable figures such as Bravo Murillo, Agustín Argüelles, Lope de Vega, Francisco de Quevedo, and Goya.

References 
Citations

Bibliography
 
 
 

War monuments and memorials
Sculptures of men in Spain
Bronze sculptures in Spain
Outdoor sculptures in Madrid
Monuments and memorials in Madrid
Buildings and structures in Embajadores neighborhood, Madrid